Dates in this table are determined by when the March Equinox falls. It will fall on March 20 from 2018-2023.

See also
Public holidays in Iran
Solar Hijri calendar
List of observances set by the Islamic calendar
List of observances set by the Baháʼí calendar

Solar Hijri calendar